Bellerive Oval, known commercially as Blundstone Arena for sponsorship reasons, is a cricket and Australian rules football ground located in Bellerive, a suburb on the eastern shore of Hobart, Australia, holding 20,000 people it is the largest capacity stadium in Tasmania. It is the only venue in Tasmania which hosts international cricket matches.

The venue is the home ground for the state cricket teams, the Tasmanian Tigers and Hobart Hurricanes, as well as a venue for international Test matches since 1989 and one-day matches since 1988. It is also the secondary home ground for AFL club North Melbourne, who play three home games a season at the venue. The stadium has undergone significant redevelopment to accommodate such events.

History

Football and cricket first started being played in the area where Bellerive Oval is now in the mid-to-late 19th century. In 1884 the first football match on record from the area was played between Carlton and Bellerive. In 1913 the piece of land located between Bellerive Beach, Church and Derwent streets was sold to the Clarence council. One year later, the new Bellerive recreation ground was ready for use.

The ground barely changed from then until the mid-1980s. During this time the ground had a hump in the centre of the ground making only the top half of players visible from the other side of the ground. There was a shed for players located where the main pavilion now stands. There was a hill on the outer (where the hill now is) that could accommodate two rows of vehicles, the small scoreboard stood on the outer close to where the electronic scoreboard is now, and the time clock sat about halfway up a training light tower. The police booth sat, until very recently, in the north-east corner of the oval. A concrete cricket pitch served for local junior teams until the 1956/57 season, when it was replaced by a turf wicket.

In 1948 The Clarence Football Club, a tenant of the ground, applied to join the Tasmanian Football League, and the ground had to upgrade to TFL standards.

Some minor upgrades were made in the 1960s, clubrooms were built in 1961, and in 1963 a small grandstand (seating about 500) and a new PA system were installed.

TCA moves to Bellerive
In 1977, Tasmania gained admission into the Sheffield Shield and a plan was put in place by the TCA to move from its headquarters at the TCA Ground on the Domain to a new oval. Bellerive Oval was chosen ahead of KGV Oval and North Hobart Oval. $2,200,000 was spent building new grandstands, training nets, a hill, new surface and centre wicket, the old TCA Ground scoreboard was relocated there, and the masterpiece—the three-level Members' Pavilion was constructed.
 
The newly refurbished ground was opened in 1986 for a TFL Statewide League roster match between Clarence and Hobart, which was won by Clarence before a crowd of 3,562. Significant damage to the newly laid turf resulted in the scheduling of no more football matches for that season.

The move was made in 1987 under TCA Chairman Denis Rogers, in time for its first international match—between Sri Lanka and New Zealand—on 12 January 1988, before a crowd of 6,500.

The first Test match in Tasmania was played at Bellerive from 16 to 20 December 1989, between Australia and Sri Lanka. Shortly afterwards, the new electronic scoreboard and Northern Stand were erected.

In 2007, the venue saw the Tasmanian Tigers win the state's first Pura Cup, and in 2008 the ground hosted its first Ford Ranger Cup final, also won by Tasmania.

The oval became the first top-class cricket facility in Australia to sign a naming-rights sponsor in October 2011.  An agreement with Blundstone Footwear attached the name "Blundstone Arena", which was temporarily discontinued during the ground's use in the 2015 Cricket World Cup.

Structures and facilities

In 1999, the Federal Government announced that it would contribute $5 million to upgrade Bellerive.  The TCA added $10 million, on loan from the state government, and the Clarence City Council $1 million, enabling a $16 million upgrade. The first part of this upgrade was the state-of-the-art indoor nets. The 6,000-seat Southern Stand came next, which blocked winds and views of the Derwent, and contained the new media centre. The new Members' Area was the last of the upgrades, along with new perimeter fence and entry gates. The Members' Area features press and radio media areas, corporate boxes and lunchrooms, as well as the players areas, members' bars and TCA offices. The redevelopment was officially opened on 11 January 2003, when an overcrowd of 16,719 (official capacity 16000) witnessed a thrilling one-day match between Australia and England, the victory going to Australia. Tasmanian Tiger Shane Watson became the hero for Australia, bowling the very tense final over.

To allow for day-night matches to be played at the venue, four light towers were installed in 2009 at a cost of A$4.8 million, enabling one-day international (ODI) and Twenty20 cricket matches to be played there. The installation of these lights sparked significant debate from groups both for and against the new towers.

The ground was scheduled for further redevelopment by 2015, with the state government providing $15 million to expand the Southern Stand and Members' Stand, increasing the ground's capacity to over 20,000 for the 2015 Cricket World Cup, along with an Ashes Test in the future, and the possibility of locking-in a long-term commitment for AFL games. AFL Tasmania is also looking at moving its offices to the ground as part of the redevelopment. At the official launch of the renovated stadium, it was announced that the new stand would be named the Ricky Ponting Stand, and the existing Southern Stand would be named the David Boon Stand.

Events
As well as being the home of domestic and international cricket and the Clarence Football Club in the now Tasmanian State League, Bellerive Oval served in 2003 as a home to the Tasmanian Devils in the VFL. The first match attracted the highest VFL roster match crowd since 1986–6,970. The venue also hosted Tasmania's two finals matches, with the elimination win against Geelong (4,800) and 10,073 for a semi-final against Port Melbourne, which was won by Port Melbourne.

North Melbourne
In 2010, talk of Melbourne-based Australian Football League (AFL) clubs shifting home games to Bellerive Oval surfaced. Richmond were considered the early front-runners, but by July 2010 North Melbourne became the most likely candidate, given their willingness to move more than just two matches.

On 7 June 2011, the North Melbourne Football Club announced a new three-year deal in partnership with transport company TT-Line, who announced its intent to sponsor North Melbourne home games in Hobart, at Bellerive Oval. From 2012 to 2014, North Melbourne played two home games per year at the venue. The first game was played 8 April 2012 in Round 2, in which North Melbourne defeated the fledgling Greater Western Sydney Giants by 129 points.  The original three-year deal was renewed and extended for a further two years, with Hobart City Council and TT-Line (Spirit of Tasmania) agreeing to provide sponsorship for North Melbourne to play three games per year at the venue in 2015 and 2016. A new deal, which did not include the council, was struck in 2016. The current arrangement, in effect from 2017 to 2022, allows North Melbourne to continue playing three matches a season at Bellerive Oval.

Attendance records

The record attendance for Bellerive Oval before redevelopment was 16,719 for a One Day International between Australia and England on 14 January 2003. The first international match at the venue was a One Day International between New Zealand and Sri Lanka on 12 January 1988 and attracted a then record crowd for an international in Hobart of 6,180.
On 21 February 2010, a Twenty20 International match between Australia and the West Indies attracted a crowd of 15,575. This was the first international day-night cricket match played at Bellerive Oval.

The record attendance at Bellerive Oval since the addition of the Ricky Ponting stand is 18,149 during a 2015–16 BBL match between Hobart Hurricanes and Perth Scorchers on 10 January 2016.

Last updated on 21 December 2021. Source:

Transport
Metro buses are available to and from Bellerive Oval and there are also ferry services from Hobart City to Bellerive Wharf. Development into an international venue has far outgrown the capacity of local infrastructure to adequately handle the large influxes of patrons attempting to access the venue. In particular, there is little provision for spectator parking. Thus, large numbers of vehicles are parked in the surrounding streets when such events are held, resulting in access issues for local residents and need for traffic-control measures.

Local controversy
In an attempt to address parking and access issues, development of the Oval has encroached upon adjacent properties and in particular the Bellerive Rotary Park situated between the Oval and the beach. This park is on land owned by the Clarence Council as is the adjacent Oval. As the Oval is an exclusive, fenced-off area and the park is an inclusive area open to all residents, many residents reject the encroachment.

See also
 List of international cricket centuries at Bellerive Oval
 List of Test cricket grounds

References

External links

 
 
ESPN Cricinfo
Clarence City Council
Tasmanian Cricket Association

Sports venues in Hobart
Test cricket grounds in Australia
Australian rules football grounds
Landmarks in Hobart
1914 establishments in Australia
Sports venues completed in 1914
Women's Big Bash League
City of Clarence
1992 Cricket World Cup stadiums
2015 Cricket World Cup stadiums